József Csík (born 1 January 1946 in Üllő) is a Hungarian former javelin thrower who competed in the 1972 Summer Olympics.

References

1946 births
Living people
Hungarian male javelin throwers
Olympic athletes of Hungary
Athletes (track and field) at the 1972 Summer Olympics
Universiade medalists in athletics (track and field)
Sportspeople from Pest County
Universiade silver medalists for Hungary
Medalists at the 1970 Summer Universiade